This is a chronological list of some ships launched in 2023.


References

2022
Ship launches
 
Ship launches